Edward Michael Pakenham, 2nd Baron Longford (1 April 1743 – 3 June 1792) was an Irish sailor and landowner.

Early life
Pakenham was the son of Thomas Pakenham, 1st Baron Longford and Elizabeth Cuffe, 1st Countess of Longford. His parents had seven children, including Sir Thomas Pakenham, a Royal Navy officer.

His father was the eldest son and heir of Edward Pakenham MP of Pakenham Hall (son of Sir Thomas Pakenham) and Margaret Bradestan (daughter and heiress of John Bradestan). His mother was the daughter and sole heiress of Michael Cuffe MP (second son and sole heir of Francis Cuffe), and Frances (née Sandford) Cuffe (a daughter of Henry Sandford of Castlereagh).

Longford was educated at Kilkenny College and joined the Royal Navy at the age of sixteen.

Career
He served during the Seven Years' War taking part in naval engagements off the coasts of West Africa and North America. He was captured by the Spanish near the end of the war and held for over a year. After he returned home following the Treaty of Paris he briefly represented County Longford in the Irish House of Commons between 1765 and 1766.

In 1776, he inherited his father's title and seat in the Irish House of Lords. In January 1778 he returned to active service during the American War of Independence, serving in the English Channel and Mediterranean Sea. He returned home in 1782 having earned around £5,000 in prize money.

Personal life
In 1768, Lord Longford married Hon. Catherine Rowley, daughter of Elizabeth Rowley, 1st Viscountess Langford and Hercules Langford Rowley MP.  He was the owner of Pakenham Hall Castle in County Westmeath, which he systematically improved during his lifetime. Catherine and Edward had a number of children including:

 Hon. Catherine "Kitty" Pakenham (1773–1831), who married the Arthur Wellesley, 1st Duke of Wellington.
 Thomas Pakenham, 2nd Earl of Longford (1774–1835), who married Lady Georgiana Emma Charlotte Lygon, daughter of William Lygon, 1st Earl Beauchamp.
 Maj.-Gen. Hon. Sir Edward Pakenham (1778–1815), who served as MP for Longford Borough and was killed in action at the Battle of New Orleans.
 Lt.-Gen. Hon. Sir Hercules Robert Pakenham (1781–1850), a lieutenant-general of the British Army and was brevet colonel and aide-de-camp to William IV. He married Emily Stapleton, the fourth daughter of Sir Thomas Stapleton, 6th Baronet, 12th Baron le Despencer.
 Capt. Hon. William Pakenham (d. 1811), a member of the Royal Navy who drowned in 1811.
 Very Rev. Hon. Henry Pakenham (1787–1863), the Dean of St Patrick's Cathedral who married Eliza Catherine Sandford (d. 1867), sister and co-heiress of Henry Sandford, 2nd Baron Mount Sandford.
 Hon. Elizabeth Pakenham (d. 1851), who married Henry Stewart of Trycallen in 1793.
 Hon. Helen Pakenham (d. 1807), who married James Hamilton (d. 1805), eldest son of John Hamilton of Brown Hall, in 1799.
 Hon. Caroline Penelope Pakenham (d. 1854), who married Henry Hamilton (d. 1850), eldest son of Sackville Hamilton, in 1808.

Langford died in June 1792, aged 49, and was succeeded in the barony by his eldest son Thomas, who in 1794 also succeeded his grandmother in the earldom of Longford.

References

1743 births
1792 deaths
Irish sailors
People from County Westmeath
People educated at Kilkenny College
Royal Navy personnel of the American Revolutionary War
Royal Navy personnel of the Seven Years' War
Barons in the Peerage of Ireland
Members of the Privy Council of Ireland
Edward
Heirs apparent who never acceded
Irish MPs 1761–1768
Members of the Parliament of Ireland (pre-1801) for County Longford constituencies